Castle Mountains National Monument is a U.S. National Monument located in the eastern Mojave Desert and northeastern San Bernardino County, in the state of California.

The park protects 20,920 acres, located between the interstates I−15 and I−40, and northwest of the Colorado River.

Geography
The national monument protects a section of the Castle Mountains, a range located in San Bernardino County and Clark County, Nevada. The range lies south and east of the New York Mountains, southwest of Searchlight and west of Cal-Nev-Ari, Nevada. The range lies at the northeastern end of Lanfair Valley and reaches  in elevation at the summit of Hart Peak and 5580 ft at Linder Peak. The mountains lie in a southwest-northeasterly direction. The Piute Range lies to the southeast.

Castle Mountains National Monument is surrounded on three sides by the Mojave National Preserve, managed by the National Park Service.

It surrounds the Castle Mountain Mine Area, an open pit gold mine in the southern Castle Mountains owned by Canadian NewCastle Gold Ltd., who can excavate nearly 10 million tons of ore through 2025, though due to low gold prices mining has been suspended since 2001. The national monument proclamation states that after any such mining and reclamation are completed, or after 10 years if no mining occurs, the Federal land in the 8,340 acre Castle Mountain Mine Area is to be transferred to the National Park Service.

Designation and management
It was designated by President Obama on February 12, 2016, along with Mojave Trails National Monument and Sand to Snow National Monument also in  Southern California.
 Of the three it is the only one to be managed by the National Park Service, with the other two being placed under the control of the Bureau of Land Management and/or the United States Forest Service.

See also
List of national monuments of the United States

References

External links
National Park Service: official Castle Mountains National Monument website
Campaign for the California Desert.org: Castle Mountains National Monument — natural and cultural features.
Site location of Castle Mountain Mine, adjacent south of Hart, California, at south region of Castle Mountains

Lanfair Valley
National Park Service National Monuments in California
Parks in San Bernardino County, California
Protected areas of the Mojave Desert
Protected areas established in 2016
2016 establishments in California
National Monuments designated by Barack Obama